Papyrus 69 (designated by 𝔓69 in the Gregory-Aland numbering) is a small fragment from the Gospel of Luke dating to the 3rd century.

Description 
This fragment omits the entire detailed content of Jesus’ prayer in Luke 22:42–45a. At Luke 22:61 Peter (not Jesus) is looking. Claire Clivaz has suggested that 𝔓69 (P. Oxy 2383) should be regarded 'as a witness to a Marcionite edition of Luke's Gospel'. Peter M. Head feels that 'the suggestion that 𝔓69 is a manuscript of Marcion's Gospel is a very clever idea which is however not proven and not the most plausible context for making sense of this fascinating manuscript'.

The Greek text of this codex is a representative of the Western text-type. According to Aland text is very free, "characteristic of precursors of the D-text", therefore Aland placed it in Category IV.

Text
[recto]
 [εις πειρασ]μ[ον] [41] κ̣[αι αυτος απεσ]
 [πασθη απ αυτων ωσ]ε̣ι λιθου β̣ο̣λ̣[ην]
 [και θεις τα γονατα προσ]η̣υ̣χ̣ε̣τ̣ο̣
 [45] [ελθων προς τους μ̣αθ]ητ[ας ευ]
 [ρεν αυτους καθευ]δοντας κοι
 [μωμενους αυτους απο τη]ς̣ λυπης [46] [κ]α̣ι̣
 [ειπεν αυτοις] τ̣ι κ̣α̣θευδ̣ε
 [τε ανασταντες πρ]ο̣σ̣ευχεσ̣θ̣ε
 [ινα μη εισελθητε εις πει]ρ̣ασμ̣ο̣ν̣
 [47] [ετι δε αυτου λαλουντος ι]δου̣
 [οχλος και ο λεγομενος ιου]δ̣ας
 [εις των ι̅β̅ προηρχετο α]υ̣[τ]ους
 [και εγγισας εφιλησε]ν̣ τ̣ον ι̣̅η̅ν̅
 [48] [ι̅η̅ς̅ δε ειπεν αυτω ιουδα φι]λ̣η̣[ματι

[verso]
 [58] – [ιδων] α̣υ̣[τ]ω̣ ε̣[φη και συ εξ αυτων ει]
 ο̣ δ̣ε ειπεν [α̅ν̅ε̅ ουκ ειμι [59] και δι]
 α̣σ̣τασης ωσ̣[ει ωρας α̅ αλλος τις ισχυ]
 ριζ̣ετο λεγω[ν επ αληθειας και]
 ου̣τ̣ο̣ς ην μ[ετ αυτου και γαρ γα]
 λ̣[ι]λ̣α̣ιος εστ̣[ιν] [60] [ειπεν δε ο πετρος]
 α̣ν̣̅ε ουκ οι[δα ο λεγεις και ετι]
 αυτου λαλου̣[ντος παραχρημα]
 ε̣φωνησεν̣ [αλεκτωρ] [61] [και στρα]
 φεις ο πε̣τ̣ρ̣[ος ενεβλεψεν αυ]
 τω τοτε [υπεμνησθη ο πετρος]
 τ̣ου ρημ[ατος του κ̅υ̅ ως ειπεν]
 αυ̣τω π[ριν αλεκτορα φωνησαι ση]
 μ̣[ερον απαρνηση με τρις] [62] [και]

See also 
 List of New Testament papyri
 Luke 22
 Christ's agony at Gethsemane

References

Further reading
 Kurt Aland, Alter und Entstehung des D-Textes im Neuen Testament. Betrachtung zu P69 und 0171, Miscellànea papirològica Ramo Roca-Puig, S. Janeras, Barcelona, 1987, pp. 37–61.
 Clivaz, C., (2005) The Angel and the Sweat Like "Drops of Blood" (Lk 22:43-44): P69 and f13, HTR 98, 
 Ehrman & Plunkett (1983), The Angel and the Agony: The Textual Problem of Luke 22:43 44, Catholic Biblical Quarterly 45, pp. 401–16. 
 Head (1993), Peter M., Christology and Textual Transmission: Reverential Alterations in the Synoptic Gospels, Novum Testamentum, Vol. 35, Fasc. 2 (Apr., 1993), esp. pp. 123–126. 
 Lobel E., C. H. Roberts, E. G. Turner, J. W. B. Barns, Oxyrhynchus Papyri XXIV, London 1957, pp. 1–4.
 Wayment (2008), Thomas A., A new transcription of POxy 2383 (P69), NovT 50, pp. 351–57.

Images
 P69/P.Oxy.L 2383
 Images of P69 at the Center for the Study of New Testament Manuscripts

External links
 POxy – Oxyrhynchus Papyri online database
 PM Head's initial review of Clivaz and PM Head's further discussion
 

New Testament papyri
3rd-century biblical manuscripts
Early Greek manuscripts of the New Testament
Gospel of Luke papyri
Sackler library manuscripts